Grumman Tiger may refer to:

Grumman F-11 Tiger
Grumman American AA-5 Tiger